Ten seconds may refer to:

Film and television
10 Seconds, a television game show that aired on The Nashville Network from March 29, 1993 to March 25, 1994. 
10 Seconds (film), a 2008 German film

Music
"10 Seconds" (song), a 2010 song by Jazmine Sullivan
"Ten Seconds", a song by Ane Brun from the 2008 album Changing of the Seasons
"Ten Seconds", a song by BLAZE from the 2004 album Blood & Belief
Ten Seconds was a progressive rock band that put out an album on Discipline Global Mobile records in 1996

Sports
ten-second runoff, a type of penalty in gridiron football
Ten-second rule or 10-second rule may refer to:
 an American football rule whereby the remaining game time may be reduced by ten seconds if a team is considered to have intentionally delayed the game
 a basketball rule in some leagues whereby the offense has ten seconds (eight seconds under international rules) to advance the ball to their forecourt
 a variation of the Five-second rule, whereby food fallen to the floor for less than five seconds may be considered by some to be safe to eat